The John Newcomb House is a historic house in Wellfleet, Massachusetts.  It is best known as the house described by Henry David Thoreau in the chapter on the "House of the Wellfleet Oysterman" in his 1865 book, Cape Cod.  The house is located in Cape Cod National Seashore, on a sandy lane off Gull Pond Road to the east of Williams Pond in northern Wellfleet.  The Cape style house is presumed to have been built by John Y. Newcomb (born 1762).

The house was listed on the National Register of Historic Places in 1988.

See also
National Register of Historic Places listings in Barnstable County, Massachusetts

References

National Register of Historic Places in Cape Cod National Seashore
Houses in Barnstable County, Massachusetts
Wellfleet, Massachusetts
Houses on the National Register of Historic Places in Barnstable County, Massachusetts